Merry Shannon is an American author. She writes lesbian romance/adventure novels and short stories published by Bold Strokes Books.

Life
Shannon was born in Sacramento, California, and grew up in Texas and Colorado. She received her B.A. in English from the University of Colorado at Colorado Springs in 2001, and went on to a career in social work. She is presently a full-time social worker who writes novels in her spare time. Her first novel, Sword of the Guardian - A Legend of Ithyria was published in 2006 by Bold Strokes Books.

Shannon lives in Aurora, Colorado with her partner.

Awards 
Shannon has received two Golden Crown Literary Society awards for Debut Author and Speculative Fiction, and the 2008 Lesbian Fiction Readers' Choice Award for Favorite Adventure book. Her second novel, Branded Ann, was also a 2008 ForeWord Magazine Book of the Year finalist.

Bibliography
Shannon has published two novels and three short stories with LGBTQ publisher Bold Strokes Books.

Novels

Sword of the Guardian - A Legend of Ithyria, 2006 (Golden Crown Literary Society Award Winner, 2007)
Branded Ann, 2008 (ForeWord Magazine Book of the Year Finalist, 2008)
Prayer of the Handmaiden, 2015</ref>)

Short Stories

"Rebellious Heart", published in the 2008 anthology Romantic Interludes 1: Discovery
"The Whisper", published in the 2009 anthology Romantic Interludes 2: Secrets
"Lucky Number Seven", published in the 2012 anthology Women of the Dark Streets: Lesbian Paranormal

References

External links

 Merry Shannon's website
 

1979 births
Living people
21st-century American novelists
American fantasy writers
American women short story writers
American women novelists
American lesbian writers
People from Aurora, Colorado
Women science fiction and fantasy writers
Novelists from Colorado
American LGBT novelists
LGBT people from Colorado
21st-century American women writers
21st-century American short story writers